Andrew Wilson is a British landscape architect garden designer, lecturer and writer. He is a partner in Wilson McWilliam Studio and founded The London College of Garden Design. He has judged for the Royal Horticultural Society at the Chelsea Flower Show, Hampton court and Tatton Park and has also judged the Bloom Festival in Ireland.  He wrote a regular column for Gardens Illustrated and contributes to the Royal Horticultural Society's journal The Garden alongside the production of a series of books, the most recent of which are Influential Gardeners, The Book of Garden Plans  and the Book of Plans for Small Gardens, The Gardens of Luciano Guibbilei  and Contemporary Colour in the Garden. He is also the founding editor of The Garden Design Journal  and is a former Chairman and currently a Fellow of the Society of Garden Designers, the UK’s professional body for garden design.

References

Selected projects

Savill Garden, Windsor Great Park 2008 New Rose Garden with Gavin McWilliam for Wilson McWilliam Studio

British garden writers
British landscape architects
Living people
Year of birth missing (living people)